Ricardo José da Silva Fernandes (born 28 October 1994) is a Portuguese professional footballer who plays for C.D. Santa Clara as a goalkeeper.

Club career
Born in Oliveira do Bairro, Aveiro District, Fernandes spent his first three years as a senior in the third division. In July 2016, he signed with Segunda Liga club AD Fafe on loan from C.F. Os Belenenses, making his debut as a professional on 31 July of that month in a 0–1 home loss against F.C. Vizela in the first stage of the Portuguese League Cup. His maiden league appearance took place on 28 November, when he kept a clean sheet to help the visitors defeat S.L. Benfica B 1–0.

Fernandes returned to the Estádio do Restelo for the 2017–18 season, where he acted as third or fourth choice. He made his Primeira Liga debut on 12 May 2018, coming on as a substitute for Muriel in the last nine minutes of the 1–0 away defeat to Boavista F.C. in the last matchday.

On 22 May 2018, Fernandes dropped into the second tier on a two-year contract at F.C. Famalicão. He was back-up to Rafael Defendi as the team won promotion as runners-up, moving on to Académico de Viseu FC; on his first of three appearances in his debut campaign for the latter on 22 December 2019, he was sent off for a foul on Mohamed Bouldini.

Fernandes took the starting spot from Ricardo Janota in his second season in Viseu. At its conclusion, he signed a three-year deal at top-flight C.D. Santa Clara on 23 June 2021.

References

External links

Portuguese League profile 

1994 births
Living people
People from Oliveira do Bairro
Sportspeople from Aveiro District
Portuguese footballers
Association football goalkeepers
Primeira Liga players
Liga Portugal 2 players
Campeonato de Portugal (league) players
C.F. Os Belenenses players
S.C.U. Torreense players
AD Oliveirense players
Anadia F.C. players
AD Fafe players
F.C. Famalicão players
Académico de Viseu F.C. players
C.D. Santa Clara players